Pinnow is a railway station in the town of Pinnow, Brandenburg, Germany. The station lies of the Angermünde-Schwedt railway and the train services are operated by Deutsche Bahn and Niederbarnimer Eisenbahn.

Train services
The station is served by the following service(s):

Regional services  Schwedt - Angermünde - Berlin - Ludwigsfelde - Jüterbog - Lutherstadt Wittenberg
Local services  Schwedt - Angermünde

References

External links

Railway stations in Brandenburg
Buildings and structures in Uckermark (district)
Railway stations in Germany opened in 1888